Trichobactrus is a monotypic genus of Mongolian sheet weavers containing the single species, Trichobactrus brevispinosus. It was first described by J. Wunderlich in 1995, and is only found in Mongolia.

See also
 List of Linyphiidae species (Q–Z)

References

Linyphiidae
Monotypic Araneomorphae genera
Spiders of Asia